Singles Going Steady is a compilation album by English punk rock band Buzzcocks, first released on I.R.S. Records in the United States on 25 September 1979.

Background 
Singles Going Steady was the first Buzzcocks album to be released in North America and intended as an introduction to the band for the American public, coinciding with a tour of the US. Side one of the original release of the album featured their eight UK single releases on United Artists Records from 1977 up to the time of Singles Going Steady's release in 1979 in chronological order, while side two featured their corresponding B-sides, also in chronological order.

After healthy sales on import in the UK over the next two years, and following the group's split in early 1981, the album was belatedly released in the band's home country on United Artists Records on 16 November 1981 as a 'greatest hits' album. However, as in the US, the album failed to chart.

The album was reissued in expanded form on compact disc in 2001 with an extra eight tracks, featuring the A-sides and B-sides of Buzzcocks' four singles released between Singles Going Steady and the group's break-up.

Critical reception

Reviewing the album on import in 1979, NME called Buzzcocks "a vital part of the inspiration for the new pop age... This is the best album Buzzcocks never made. Hear it and weep." A second review by the NME two years later upon the album's official UK release was no less enthusiastic, declaring that "this is the best Buzzcocks long-player to be realised, enshrining eight singles and their B-sides in a compilation which at a stroke helps to forgive the inconsistency of their other albums and clarifies the enormous debt which post-Buzzcocks pop owes to this frail practitioner [referring to Buzzcocks principal songwriter and singer Pete Shelley]... Employing the most traditional of beat group formations and turning their attention to the most elemental considerations, Shelley and the Buzzcocks created pop of such intense truthfulness it literally hurts."

Melody Maker claimed that "to describe it as 'wonderful' would be doing the lads a gross injustice... Somehow, they devised a simple, crude but hugely effective medium for songs which were fast, funny and memorable." Reviewing the 2001 reissue, Q said, "When Kurt Cobain picked these aging English punk rockers as the support act on Nirvana's final tour, the Buzzcocks received long-overdue recognition as one of the punk era's greatest singles groups... this singles collection, newly supplemented with eight bonus tracks, has lost none of its vitality."

Looking back in 2019, Pitchforks Jason Heller called the compilation "a paragon of songwriting about the pain and joy of love" and wrote that it "stands as one of the most endearing, intimate, and impeccably crafted batch of earworms in either the love-song or punk-rock realm". Heller praised the album's willingness to address emotions through punk music, saying, "Unrequited longing, severed ties, knock-kneed bashfulness, rash declarations of euphoric infatuation: Shelley delivers it all with jaunty melodies and deceptively complex chord progressions on par with the Beatles and the Kinks".

Accolades
In 2003, Singles Going Steady was ranked at number 358 on Rolling Stones list of The 500 Greatest Albums of All Time. It has been subsequently included on updates of the list published in 2012 (at number 360) and in 2020 (at number 250).

In 2004, Pitchfork listed Singles Going Steady as the 16th best album of the 1970s.

Track listing
Side one

Side two

Personnel
Buzzcocks
Pete Shelley – lead vocals, guitar
Steve Diggle – guitar, backing vocals, lead vocal on "Harmony in My Head"
Steve Garvey – bass guitar (except "Orgasm Addict" and "What Ever Happened To?")
John Maher – drums
Garth Smith – bass guitar on "Orgasm Addict" and "What Ever Happened To?"

Release history

See also
 Buzzcocks discography

References

1979 compilation albums
Albums produced by Martin Hannett
Albums produced by Martin Rushent
Buzzcocks albums
EMI Records compilation albums